was a JR East railway station located in Rikuzentakata, Iwate Prefecture, Japan. The station was destroyed by the 2011 Tōhoku earthquake and tsunami and has now been replaced by a provisional bus rapid transit line.

Lines
Takekoma Station was served by the Ōfunato Line, and was located 82.5 rail kilometers from the terminus of the line at Ichinoseki Station.

Station layout
Takekoma Station had a single side platform serving one bi-directional track. The station was unattended.

History
Takekoma Station opened on 14 December 1933. The station was absorbed into the JR East network upon the privatization of the Japan National Railways (JNR) on April 1, 1987. The station was one of six stations on the Ōfunato Line destroyed by the 11 March 2011 Tōhoku earthquake and tsunami. Services have now been replaced by a BRT.

Surrounding area
  National Route 340
  National Route 343
Takekoma Jinja

See also
 List of railway stations in Japan

References

External links

  

Railway stations in Iwate Prefecture
Ōfunato Line
Railway stations in Japan opened in 1933
Railway stations closed in 2011
Rikuzentakata, Iwate
Stations of East Japan Railway Company